Sir James Nasmyth, 1st Baronet (died 1720), also known as James Naesmith, was a successful Scottish lawyer.

Life
He was the son of John Nasmyth and his wife, Isabella, daughter of Sir James Murray, Lord Philiphaugh. He was admitted advocate in 1684.  He acquired the estate of Dawick from the last of the Veitch family. He had a crown charter of the barony of Dawick in 1703, ratified in parliament in 1705, and was created a baronet of Scotland on 31 July 1706. He died in July 1720.

Family
Nasmyth married three times:

 To Jane Stewart, widow of Sir Ludovic Gordon, bart., of Gordonstoun, Elgin; 
 To Janet, daughter of Sir William Murray of Stanhope, Peeblesshire; and,
 To Barbara (d. 1768), daughter of Andrew Pringle of Clifton, Roxburghshire.

Sir James Nasmyth, 2nd Baronet was the eldest son by the third marriage.

Notes

 
Attribution
 

Year of birth missing
1720 deaths
Scottish lawyers
Baronets in the Baronetage of Nova Scotia